Burnt Bridge Creek is a  stream flowing for most of its length within the city of Vancouver in the U.S. state of Washington. It begins as drainage from field ditches near the unincorporated community of Orchards, east of the city. The creek flows generally west to Vancouver Lake.

For its first , the creek follows a combination of natural and artificial channels, then continues along a small canyon for the rest of its course. The creek receives water from Cold Creek, its largest tributary, as well as Peterson Creek, Burton Channel, and an unnamed stream.

Watershed and water quality
Burnt Bridge Creek drains  of mostly urban land. Only 4 percent of the basin is forested, whereas 23 percent is devoted to fields, pastures, and shrubland, and 73 percent has been developed for urban use.

The water quality of surface streams in the basin range from "poor" to "very poor". Burnt Bridge Creek does not meet the Washington Department of Ecology standards for fecal coliform bacteria, temperature, acidity, and levels of dissolved oxygen. Despite the degraded habitat, the lowermost part of the creek supports coho salmon, rainbow trout and steelhead are also present.

Recreation
The  mixed-use Burnt Bridge Creek Greenway Trail runs along the creek through the middle of Vancouver. The hard-surface path is used for walking, biking, and jogging, and offers opportunities for wildlife viewing. The trail begins at Stewart Glen, a city park, and passes through Leverich Park, another city park. Both parks have picnic areas, restrooms, and other amenities.

See also
List of rivers of Washington

References

Rivers of Clark County, Washington
Rivers of Washington (state)